Mendoza is an unincorporated community in Caldwell County, in the U.S. state of Texas. According to the Handbook of Texas, the community had a population of 100 in 2000. It is located within the Greater Austin metropolitan area.

History
A post office was established at Mendoza in 1892 and remained in operation until 1911. Sources differ as to whether the community was named for Antonio de Mendoza or a local settler. The 1936 county highway map showed a church, a cemetery, an industrial site, several other businesses, and numerous homes in the community. Only one business was reported in the community in 1987. In the first quarter of the 20th century, Mendoza had a population of 200 residents. During the Great Depression, its population fell to 100 and remained at that number until the mid-1960s when it dropped to 50 residents. It was that same number in 1990 and grew back to 100 in 2000.

On December 7, 2009, a Piper PA-46-500TP, registration number N600YE, impacted terrain near the community in a steep descending right turn during an ILS approach in low visibility, substantially damaging the aircraft and killing the pilot and single passenger. Immediately before the crash, an air traffic controller at Austin-Bergstrom International Airport had instructed the pilot to perform a "combination of descending turns" and "heading changes [that] were rapid [and] of large magnitude..." Additionally, post-crash toxicological tests of the pilot found evidence of diphenhydramine, a sedating antihistamine. The accident was attributed to "The pilot's spatial disorientation, which resulted in his loss of airplane control. Contributing to the pilot's spatial disorientation was the sequence and timing of the instructions issued by the air traffic controller. The pilot's operation of the airplane after using impairing medication may also have contributed."

Geography

Education
In 1905, Mendoza had a school with one teacher and 47 students. It also had a school featured on the 1936 county highway map. Today the community is served by the Lockhart Independent School District.

Notable people
 Dr. Danger and Mary, a daredevil duo, who appeared on America's Got Talent: Extreme.

See also
Texas State Highway 130
KKYX

References

Unincorporated communities in Caldwell County, Texas
Unincorporated communities in Texas